Darreh Shiri-ye Gerdab (also Romanized as Darreh Shīrī-ye Gerdāb; also known as Darreh Shīr) is a village in Charam Rural District, in the Central District of Charam County, Kohgiluyeh and Boyer-Ahmad Province, Iran. At the 2006 census, its population was 270, in 45 families.

References 

Populated places in Charam County